The Thirty-Seventh Wisconsin Legislature convened from  to  in regular session.

Senators representing even-numbered districts were newly elected for this session and were serving the first two years of a four-year term. Assembly members were elected to a two-year term. Assembly members and even-numbered senators were elected in the general election of November 4, 1884. Senators representing odd-numbered districts were serving the third and fourth year of a four-year term, having been elected in the general election of November 7, 1882.

Major events
 January 27, 1885: John Coit Spooner elected United States Senator by the Wisconsin Legislature in Joint Session.
 February 16, 1885: Charles Dow published the first edition of the Dow Jones Industrial Average.
 March 4, 1885: Inauguration of Grover Cleveland as the 22nd President of the United States.
 March 12, 1885: Wisconsin state legislator William Freeman Vilas was confirmed as United States Postmaster General.
 March 26, 1885: Prussia began deporting Poles and Jews from their territory.
 June 17, 1885: The Statue of Liberty arrived at New York Harbor.
 May 1, 1886: A general strike began in the United States.
 May 4, 1886: Wisconsin National Guard soldiers fired at a group of striking workers in Bay View, Milwaukee, killing seven, in an incident known as the Bay View massacre.
 May 17, 1886: The United States Supreme Court, in the case Santa Clara County v. Southern Pacific Railroad Co., held that corporations had the same rights as living persons.
 September 4, 1886: Apache leader Geronimo surrendered to U.S. Army forces at Skeleton Canyon, Arizona.
 September 9, 1886: The Berne Convention for the Protection of Literary and Artistic Works was signed in Bern, Switzerland.
 November 2, 1886: Jeremiah McLain Rusk re-elected as Governor of Wisconsin.

Major legislation
 March 9, 1885: An Act relating to fire escapes, and amendatory of section 4575a, of the revised statutes, 1885 Act 50.  Required easy-to-access metallic or fire-proof fire escape ladders for buildings taller than three floors.
 March 23, 1885: An Act to regulate the practice of dentistry, and to establish a state board of dental examiners, 1885 Act 129.
 Joint Resolution to amend section 1, article 10, of the constitution, relating to education, 1885 Joint Resolution 34.  Proposed an amendment to the Constitution of Wisconsin to clarify the wording of the section defining the office of Superintendent of Public Instruction of Wisconsin and other education-supervision officers.  The proposed amendment would also remove the maximum compensation limit for the Superintendent, which had been set at $1200 per year.

Party summary

Senate summary

Assembly summary

Sessions
 1st Regular session: January 14, 1885April 13, 1885

Leaders

Senate leadership
 President of the Senate: Sam S. Fifield (R)
 President pro tempore: Edward S. Minor (R)

Assembly leadership
 Speaker of the Assembly: Hiram O. Fairchild (R)

Members

Members of the Senate
Members of the Senate for the Thirty-Seventh Wisconsin Legislature:

Members of the Assembly
Members of the Assembly for the Thirty-Seventh Wisconsin Legislature:

Committees

Senate committees
 Senate Committee on Agriculture
 Senate Committee on Assessment and Collection of Taxes
 Senate Committee on Education
 Senate Committee on Enrolled Bills
 Senate Committee on Engrossed Bills
 Senate Committee on Federal Relations
 Senate Committee on Finance, Banks, and Insurance
 Senate Committee on Incorporations
 Senate Committee on the Judiciary
 Senate Committee on Legislative Expenditures
 Senate Committee on Manufactures and Commerce
 Senate Committee on Military Affairs
 Senate Committee on Privileges and Elections
 Senate Committee on Public Lands
 Senate Committee on Railroads
 Senate Committee on Roads and Bridges
 Senate Committee on State Affairs
 Senate Committee on Town and County Organizations

Assembly committees
 Assembly Committee on AgricultureChester Hazen, chair
 Assembly Committee on Assessment and Collection of TaxesC. E. Estabrook, chair
 Assembly Committee on Bills on their Third ReadingJohn K. Parish, chair
 Assembly Committee on CitiesJ. E. Friend, chair
 Assembly Committee on EducationC. E. Buell, chair
 Assembly Committee on Engrossed BillsSamuel B. Stanchfield, chair
 Assembly Committee on Enrolled BillsR. W. Pierce, chair
 Assembly Committee on Federal RelationsA. W. Sanborn, chair
 Assembly Committee on IncorporationsMarion Wescott, chair
 Assembly Committee on Insurance, Banks, and BankingW. H. Blyton, chair
 Assembly Committee on the JudiciaryPliny Norcross, chair
 Assembly Committee on Legislative ExpendituresS. D. Hubbard, chair
 Assembly Committee on Lumber and ManufacturesThomas B. Mills, chair
 Assembly Committee on Medical SocietiesJ. C. Reynolds, chair
 Assembly Committee on MilitiaF. W. Byers, chair
 Assembly Committee on Privileges and ElectionsCharles G. Thomas, chair
 Assembly Committee on Public ImprovementsM. C. Hobart, chair
 Assembly Committee on RailroadsH. J. Goddard, chair
 Assembly Committee on Roads and BridgesGeorge G. Cox, chair
 Assembly Committee on State LandsS. R. Clark, chair
 Assembly Committee on State AffairsL. J. Brayton, chair
 Assembly Committee on Town and County OrganizationWilliam H. Young, chair
 Assembly Committee on Ways and MeansThomas Porter, chair

Joint committees
 Joint Committee on Charitable and Penal Institutions
 Joint Committee on Claims
 Joint Committee on Printing

Employees

Senate employees
 Chief Clerk: Charles E. Bross
 Assistant Clerk: Fred W. Coon
 Bookkeeper: J. H. Whitney
 Engrossing Clerk: J. M. Hayden
 Enrolling Clerk: E. S. Hotchkiss
 Transcribing Clerk: F. J. Turner
 Proofreader: Adelbert D. Thorp
 Clerk for the Judiciary Committee: Willard W. D. Turner
 Clerk for the Committee on Enrolled Bills: John O. Newgard
 Clerk for the Committee on Engrossed Bills: John O. Newgard
 Clerk for the Committee on Claims: John O. Newgard
 Document Clerk: J. J. Marshall
 Sergeant-at-Arms: Hubert Wolcott
 Assistant Sergeant-at-Arms: T. J. George
 Postmaster: J. F. McKenzie
 Assistant Postmaster: George A. Ludington
 Gallery Attendant: Michael Bransfield
 Document Room Attendant: Frank Partridge
 Doorkeepers:
 John C. Frisvold
 Frederick H. Johnson
 Alvah Eaton
 William Crank
 Porter: O. J. Wiley
 Night Watch: H. Worthington
 Janitor: Daniel Corbett
 Messengers:
 W. M. Smith
 Ben Smith
 Lemuel Parry
 Elliot B. Davis
 Ferdinand Werner
 Adolph Glenz
 Willis Melville
 Werner Pressentine
 Guy Paine

Assembly employees
 Chief Clerk: Edwin Coe
 1st Assistant Clerk: John W. DeGroff
 2nd Assistant Clerk: Theodore W. Goldin
 Bookkeeper: J. T. Huntington
 Engrossing Clerk: Egbert Wyman
 Enrolling Clerk: L. J. Burlingame
 Transcribing Clerk: Ellis C. Oliver
 Proofreader: D. P. Beach
 Clerk for the Judiciary Committee: Frank D. Jackson
 Clerk for the Committee on Enrolled Bills: Robert W. Pierce Jr.
 Clerk for the Committee on Engrossed Bills: Warren Meiklejohn
 Document Clerk: H. G. Brown
 Sergeant-at-Arms: John M. Ewing
 Assistant Sergeant-at-Arms: William A. Adamson
 Postmaster: J. H. Young
 Assistant Postmaster: Frank M. Durkee
 Doorkeepers:
 W. A. Mayhew
 G. W. Dart
 A. A. Curtis
 Fred Dewey
 Fireman: W. J. Bendixon
 Gallery Attendants:
 Goetlieb Schuebbert
 W. Muntz
 Committee Room Attendant: L. B. Kinney
 Document Room Attendant: John H. Pulcifer
 Porter: James Nolan
 Policeman: Ed. Dempey
 Flagman: F. O. Janzen
 Night Watch: Michael J. Wallrich
 Wash Room Attendant: Bertie Oftelie
 Messengers:
 James Howley
 Willie Gillett
 Willie Baker
 Herman Schulze
 Eugene Wescott
 Charles McGee
 Eddie Sherman
 Willie Robson
 Clifford Best
 Willie Smith
 Lewis Adams

Notes

References

External links
 1885: Related Documents from Wisconsin Legislature

1885 in Wisconsin
Wisconsin
Wisconsin legislative sessions